Cary Joseph Kolat (born May 19, 1973) is an American wrestler and wrestling coach who earned two NCAA championships in 1996 and 1997 for Lock Haven University of Pennsylvania and was a member of the United States Men's Freestyle Wrestling Team from 1997–2001. During that time he won silver and bronze medals at the 1997 Krasnoyarsk and 1998 Tehran FILA Wrestling World Championships, as well as competing for the United States in freestyle wrestling at the 2000 Summer Olympics. In 2017, Kolat was inducted into the National Wrestling Hall of Fame as a Distinguished Member. Kolat is currently the head wrestling coach at United States Naval Academy.

Early life
Kolat was born in Rices Landing, Pennsylvania. He began wrestling at age five and by age seven, he had won his first national championship, an AAU age-group competition in Lincoln, Nebraska. As a young child, Kolat held up the Iowa wrestler Dan Gable as an inspiration. Kolat competed successfully in high school and international tournaments, finishing his career at Jefferson-Morgan High School with an undefeated (137-0) record and four Pennsylvania state titles. He also won a Cadet world silver medal at 55kg in 1989. During this time he was named Outstanding Wrestler four times at state meets, an honor no one else had achieved even twice. His achievements led to him being profiled in Sports Illustrated in April 1992.

Collegiate career
In 1993, Kolat began his collegiate career at Pennsylvania State University, where he went 22-5 as a freshman and advanced to the NCAA title bout before falling to T. J. Jaworksy from University of North Carolina. The following year, Kolat earned All-America honors for the second straight season and at 134 pounds was named Big Ten Wrestler of the Year. He ended his sophomore season 39-1.

After two years at Penn State, Kolat transferred to Lock Haven University of Pennsylvania where he won his first national championship in 1996, and ended the year 25-1. Kolat picked up his first undefeated season in 1996–97 going 25-0 at 142 pounds leading to his second straight national title. During his attendance at Lock Haven, Kolat was a two-time PSAC champion (1996–97) and an Eastern Wrestling League champion in 1996–97 as well as being named the Most Outstanding Wrestler at the Eastern Wrestling League Championships in both his junior and senior seasons. He ended his college wrestling career with an impressive .941 winning percentage (111-7) and 53 career falls.

International competition
After college Kolat participated in 13 international events for the United States, as member of the United States Men's Freestyle Wrestling Team from 1997–2001 at 63 kg. During that time he won a silver and a bronze medal, respectively, at the 1997 Krasnoyarsk and 1998 Tehran FILA Wrestling World Championships. He also competed for the United States in freestyle wrestling for the 2000 Summer Olympics in Sydney, Australia, where he finished ninth. Kolat was also a three-time World Cup gold medalist (1998, 1999, 2000) and World Cup silver medalist in 2001. He was also a Pan American Games gold medalist in 1999 and a Pan American gold medalist in 2000.

Return
After much time off, Kolat returned to national freestyle competition in early 2011 at the Asics US Open, where he finished 2nd behind Teyon Ware, losing 1-0, 0-4, 1-1.

In 2012, he also qualified for the 2012 US Olympic Trials.

Coaching career
After his college wrestling career ended, Kolat finished his degree in criminal justice at Lock Haven, graduating in July 2003. He then coached at Lock Haven, Lehigh, Wisconsin, West Virginia, and North Carolina.  He now runs a wrestling instructional website called Kolat.com.

In April 2014, Kolat was named the head coach of Campbell University's wrestling program in Buies Creek, North Carolina. Kolat replaced Joe Boardwine and, after Dave Auble, is the second Olympian wrestler to serve as Campbell's head coach.

In March 2020, he was hired as head coach at the U.S. Naval Academy in Annapolis, Maryland.

Kolat is married to his wife Erin and has two daughters, Zoe and Gracie, and youngest son, Ryder.

See also
List of Pennsylvania State University Olympians

References

1973 births
Living people
Olympic wrestlers of the United States
Wrestlers at the 2000 Summer Olympics
American male sport wrestlers
People from Greene County, Pennsylvania
Lock Haven Bald Eagles wrestlers
Penn State Nittany Lions wrestlers
Lock Haven Bald Eagles wrestling coaches
Lehigh Mountain Hawks wrestling coaches
Wisconsin Badgers wrestling coaches
West Virginia Mountaineers wrestling coaches
North Carolina Tar Heels wrestling coaches
Campbell Fighting Camels wrestling coaches
World Wrestling Championships medalists
Pan American Games gold medalists for the United States
Pan American Games medalists in wrestling
Wrestlers at the 1999 Pan American Games
Medalists at the 1999 Pan American Games